The 2013 World Club Challenge (PROBIZ World Club Challenge for sponsorship purposes) was the fourteenth consecutive annual World Club Challenge and was contested by Super League XVII champions, Leeds Rhinos and 2012 NRL Premiers, the Melbourne Storm. It took place on Friday 22 February at 8pm GMT (Saturday 23 February 7:00am AEDST). Melbourne prevailed after a hard-fought contest 18-14.

Background
2013's match was third time ever that these two clubs have played each other, with Leeds having won the 2008 World Club Challenge, and Melbourne winning, and subsequently being stripped of, the 2010 World Club Challenge title.

On 19 February the World Club Challenge was officially announced as a sellout with all 20,400 tickets sold. In addition the referees for the match were also announced, with Ben Thaler to take charge of the game.

Leeds Rhinos

Leeds finished Super League XVII's regular season in 5th place and went on to defeat 2nd-placed Warrington Wolves 26-18 in the grand final, qualifying the Rhinos for their second World Club Challenge in succession and 6th overall.

Melbourne Storm

The Storm finished the 2012 NRL season in 2nd place and went on to defeat the 1st-placed Canterbury-Bankstown Bulldogs 14 - 4 in the grand final, qualifying Melbourne for their fourth World Club Challenge, and first since 2010.

The Storm unveiled their special one-off jersey designed especially for the World Cup Challenge in December 2012 The design resembles the club’s away jersey with its predominantly white body but also includes the iconic purple V' that continues to represent the club’s Victorian heritage.

On 10 February 2013, the Melbourne Storm announced the 21-man Squad that will make the trip to London for the World Club Challenge, the team is as follows: Kenny Bromwich, Jesse Bromwich, Will Chambers, Cooper Cronk, Brett Finch, Mahe Fonua, Ben Hampton, Tohu Harris, Ryan Hinchcliffe, Ryan Hoffman, Junior Moors, Bryan Norrie, Justin O’Neill, Jason Ryles, Junior Sa’u, Lagi Setu, Billy Slater, Cameron Smith (capt), Siosaia Vave, Sisa Waqa, Gareth Widdop.

On 20 February 2013 the above squad was trimmed to 19 players with the official announcement of the team. Two interchange players were further cut when the final team was announced on the Friday before the game, final teams listed below.

Teams

Match details

First half
The match was a close, hard-fought contest throughout. Melbourne opened the scoring with an early penalty goal. A slick pass from half back, Cooper Cronk led to fullback Billy Slater scoring the first try of the match in the 20th minute. Cameron Smith kicked the conversion, making the score 8-0.  A last-tackle attacking raid in the 29th minute put Leeds winger Ryan Hall over in the left corner. Kevin Sinfield converted the goal and soon added another penalty goal to tie the game at 8-8 at half time.

Second half
Storm prop Jesse Bromwich trundled up the ball in the 44th minute and beat four defenders to score a try next to the posts, with Smith converting, to lead the game 14-8. A 50-metre movement finished with Tohu Harris racing into the clear, passing to Will Chambers with winger Sisa Waqa hemmed in by defence on the right side. Waqa found Chambers in support and the rookie Harris dived over for the try of the match. Down 18-8, Leeds captain, Sinfield kicked to the left, Ryan Hall claimed the ball and passed to Joel Moon. The centre then passed infield to second rower Jamie Jones-Buchanan who scored. With 10 minutes left, the Storm appeared to have wrapped up victory when winger Mahe Fonua scored, but referee Ben Thaler ruled forward the final pass from centre Justin O'Neill. Leeds repeatedly attacked Storm's forward line in the final minutes, but failed to capitalise, with Storm winning a close contest 18-14. Storm half back, Cooper Cronk was awarded the Man of the Match.

References

World Club Challenge
World Club Challenge
World Club Challenge
Leeds Rhinos matches
Melbourne Storm matches
Sports competitions in Leeds
Rugby league in West Yorkshire